Brett Sholl (born 7 September 1971) is a former Australian rules footballer who played for Carlton in the Australian Football League (AFL).

Sholl was a wingman but also played some games as a half forward flanker. North Melbourne recruited him from Irymple but he was unable to break into their seniors and ended up at Carlton. He gathered 13 disposals from the wing in the 1993 AFL Grand Final, which Carlton lost to Essendon.

References

Holmesby, Russell and Main, Jim (2007). The Encyclopedia of AFL Footballers. 7th ed. Melbourne: Bas Publishing.

Australian rules footballers from Victoria (Australia)
Carlton Football Club players
1971 births
Living people